Alex Trlica (born August 11, 1984) is a former American football placekicker for the Texas Tech Red Raiders football team.

As of January 9, 2007, Trlica held the NCAA record for successful point after tries. During his college career, he made 233 consecutive PATs without a miss. This, along with his field goals, put him among the nation's top all-time leading scorers for kickers and number two on Tech's all-time scoring list.

Bowl wins
A Trlica 52 yard field goal tied the 2006 Insight Bowl sending it into overtime and resulting in an eventual record-setting victory for the Red Raiders. The following season, it was Trlica's 41-yard field goal that capped-off a come-from-behind win in the 2008 Gator Bowl.

References

External links
 Player bio at Texas Tech football
 ESPN stats

1984 births
American football placekickers
Living people
Texas Tech Red Raiders football players